Tiedtke is a surname. Notable people with the surname include:

 Jakob Tiedtke (1875–1960), German actor
 Susen Tiedtke (born 1969), German long jumper
 John Tiedtke (1907–2004), American farmer, professor, businessman, and philanthropist

See also
Tiedtke's, grocery store in Ohio